Francis Kaulandai is an Anglican bishop in Malawi: since 2010  he has been Bishop of Lake Malawi, one of the four  Malawian dioceses within the Church of the Province of Central Africa.

References

Anglican bishops of Lake Malawi
21st-century Anglican bishops in Malawi